Ridley College (also known as RC, Ridley) is a private boarding and day university-preparatory school located in St. Catharines, Ontario, Canada, 20 miles (32 km) from Niagara Falls. The school confers the Ontario Secondary School Diploma and the International Baccalaureate diploma programme. Ridley is one of the oldest private schools in Canada, and has the largest boarding program in Ontario, with students representing over 61 countries.

Established as an Anglican-affiliated all-boys school in 1889, Ridley became coeducational in 1973. The school is divided into ten houses, each of which serves as a residence and community for its students. All students take part in an extensive extracurricular program including sports (ranging from a beginner to varsity level), arts and theatre opportunities, student initiatives, and community service. Ridley's boarding program plays a dominant role in its curriculum, with faculty heavily involved in student life outside the classroom in roles such as housemasters, coaches, and advisors.

Ridley is a member of the Canadian Accredited Independent Schools, the Headmasters' and Headmistresses' Conference and competes in the Conference of Independent Schools of Ontario Athletic Association (CISAA) sports conference, of which it is one of four original founding schools. Ridley has an array of student clubs, many of which take part in both Canadian and international competitions. The school's overall curriculum emphasizes a balanced and disciplined combination of academics, athletics, school involvement, and community service. Ridley alumni are known as Old Ridleians, and are entitled to use the post-nominal letters “O.R.”

History

Origins

Established in 1889, the school was founded by a group of Anglican clergymen seeking to provide boys in Ontario with an education that emphasized strong academic and religious values. Another founder, Thomas Rodman Merritt, served as President of the college until 1899. Named after Bishop Nicholas Ridley, a 16th-century English churchman martyred during the Protestant Reformation, the school was originally known as Bishop Ridley College.

The school's first campus, known as the Springbank campus, was integrated into the then-recently closed hotel of the same name constructed in 1864 by Dr. Theophilus Mack on Yates Street in St. Catharines. The Reverend Dr. John Ormsby Miller, a highly regarded scholar and administrator, assumed his duties at the school's conception as the first headmaster of Ridley College.

In 1891, the first Ridley College Cross Country Run was held, which would go on to become one of the longest standing traditions at Ridley. In the same year, the first edition of ACTA Ridleiana was published, which at the time served as an alumni newsletter (it would later change to being the school's yearbook).

Early 20th century

In 1903, the Springbank campus was destroyed as a result of a fire, resulting in the founders seeking a new site to restore it. The school was rebuilt at the site of its current campus, where the previous students of the Springbank campus would go to play sports. The address and street name of which soon became known as Ridley Road. The cornerstone of the Upper School building was laid in 1904, and the first dormitory, Dean's House, was built in 1907. Dr. Miller's 30-year tenure as headmaster would establish the foundations of the school. The oldest building remaining on campus is the cricket shed, which was already built as sports equipment storage for the students of the Springbank campus.

In 1907, the Ridley College Cadet Corps was officially recognized as Unit No. 162. The Corps was brought about by Colonel Thairs and Headmaster Miller. The first Inspection was held in 1908 with 40 cadets and in 1912, the Cadet Band was added. In 1917, the first Lower School Cross Country Run was held.

Post-World War I

The school experienced rapid growth and expansion (both population and campus-wise) in the first half of the twentieth century, including the building of Ridley College Chapel and Dormitory Building by architects Sproatt and Rolph. The Memorial Chapel and two marble plaques were built by architects Sproatt and Rolph in 1921 to commemorate the sixty-one Old Ridleians who lost their lives in World War I. In the same year, Dr. Harry Griffith became the second headmaster of Ridley. In 1922, Gooderham House, donated by the Gooderham family, was opened. The Lower School opened in 1927 with a total of eighty students (sixty boarders, nineteen day boys and one day girl). It also became home to two Upper School dormitories, Mandeville House and Leonard House.

A new dormitory, Merritt House, was built by architects Sproatt and Rolph during the Great Depression and, despite financial constraints, was opened in 1932. It was named after Thomas Rodman Merritt, Ridley's first president. In 1934, the Marriott Gates marking the entrance of the school were erected. A new gym was opened in 1939, which would later be named the Iggulden Gym. The gym accommodated swimming, squash, basketball, gymnastics, boxing and fencing, and was also home to a new stage for dramatic arts.

Post-World War II

The Schmon Infirmary and the Memorial Great Hall were built in 1949, and in that year Dr. J. R. Hamilton became the third headmaster of Ridley. Hamilton was a Science teacher and housemaster prior to becoming Headmaster in 1949. Hamilton emphasized the importance of Ridleians understanding the world around them and established periods for discussions on current affairs and debate.

The Memorial Great Hall and its accompanying List of Honour plaque were dedicated in 1950 to Old Ridleians who died serving in World War II. The first issue of the Ridley Tiger was also published that year. It became the school's alumni newsletter, and ACTA Ridleiana became the school's yearbook.

In 1962, Mr. Ted Pilgrim became the fourth headmaster of Ridley. A gradual increase in overall enrolment had taken place in the late 50s and 60s, leading to the building of Arthur Bishop House in 1965. The residence accommodated seventy-four boys and was named after Ridley's sixth president, Arthur Leonard Bishop. The Memorial Chapel was expanded in the 1960s to accommodate increased enrolment.

In 1971, Mr. Richard Bradley became the fifth headmaster of Ridley. In September 1973, Ridley became co-educational, and eleven girls were enrolled and assigned to the first floor of Dean's House (which has since reverted to a boys' residence, given that several separate girls' residences were built). Also in 1973, the McLaughlin building was built, which was named after Col. Robert Samuel McLaughlin, who pledged CAN$900,000 from the McLaughlin Foundation. The building housed fifteen new classrooms, the new Matthews Library, a new art room, and a new biology laboratory. Today, the building is still home to the Matthews Library and classrooms. In September 1978, girls began boarding. Also that year, the Griffith Arena was opened.

In 1981, Dr. Jeremy Packard became the sixth headmaster of Ridley. In 1981, the National Film Board of Canada released the documentary film Ridley: A Secret Garden about the School. In 1986, the first Chimes Challenge was held, a sprinting competition which remains an annual tradition. In 1989, as the school marked its 100th year, the Second Century Building was officially opened and dedicated as Ridley's primary science and arts facility. In the same year, Mr. Douglas Campbell became the seventh headmaster of Ridley.

1992 saw the official opening of the new headmaster's residence, Kenyon Lett House. In 1995, Mr. Rupert Lane became the eighth headmaster of Ridley. In 1999, the school underwent a critical transformation with the introduction of laptops to the classroom and curriculum.

21st century

In 2000, the book Ridley: A Canadian School, by Richard Bradley (Ridley's fifth headmaster) and Paul Lewis, was published, detailing the history and traditions of the school. In 2004, Mr. Jonathan Leigh became the ninth headmaster of Ridley.

In 2010, the new Arena/Fieldhouse Complex was opened. In 2012, Mr. Edward Kidd became the tenth headmaster of Ridley, and the International Baccalaureate program was introduced to the school.

Campus

Lower School

The Lower School is located across campus from the Upper School and the Memorial Chapel.  The Lower School includes a split Junior and Senior Kindergarten class, one class per grade from Grades 1–6, two Grade 7 classes, and two Grade 8 classes.

There are 176 students in the Lower School, of which 7% are boarding students. The average class size is 16 students. Each year, the Lower School organizes a student council.

Facilities within the Lower School building include a design shop, an art room, Grades JK-8 classrooms, a resource centre, and a boys' and girls' residence. Some facilities are shared with the Upper School, such as the music rooms and Mandeville Theatre in the Second Century Building, and the Memorial Chapel.

Students who complete their entire K-12 schooling career at Ridley, starting from the Lower School and proceeding to the Upper School, receive a special "lifer" prize at the end of Grade 12.

Upper School

There are approximately 460 students in the Upper School, of which 61% are boarding students. The average class size is 18 students. The Upper School building, known as the School House, is considered the core of the campus. It is surrounded by the Memorial Chapel, the "front circle", the infirmary, and several dormitories. It is where the majority of the school's academic and administrative activities take place.

The ground floor (known as the "first flat") of School House includes the Memorial Great Hall where students and faculty dine, the Headmaster's office, the Matthews Library, and the History Wing in which history, economics, and other social science classes are located. There is also a direct, indoor pathway to the Memorial Chapel on this floor.

The floor above ("second flat") includes English classes and the Ross Morrow Theatre, guidance counselling offices, and the computer repair centre (known as the HelpDesk).

The top floor ("third flat") is home to mathematics classes and the school's finance and administration offices.

Finally, the basement level of School House includes The Learning Centre, the school archives, sewing room, and a campus co-op store named Hank's.

Second Century Building

The Second Century Building ("2CB") is home to the school's science, music, and performing arts facilities.

For each of the core science subjects (biology, chemistry, and physics), there is a classroom used for lectures with an accompanying lab room for applied lessons and experiments. There is a robotics lab, a design workshop, a studio art classroom, and various music rooms equipped with sound-proof walls.

Finally, the Second Century Building is home to the Mandeville Theatre, which serves as the school's primary venue for musical, drama, and speaker events.

Memorial Chapel

The Memorial Chapel was built during the 1920s, dedicated to the memory of Old Ridleians who died in World War I; The honour roll is engraved on two marble plaques. The chapel was enlarged during the 1960s.

Each stained glass window is unique, bearing such non-traditional imagery as Ridley football helmets, but also more conventional Christian imagery.

The chapel is equipped with a sound system, a new Yamaha grand piano and 2 pipe organs. The Ridley Pipe Organ is a Casavant Freres Opus 1099. It had a second manual keyboard added later in its life. The pipes for this added organ are located at the back of the chapel, while the original four sets (great, choir, swell, and pedal) are at the front. The Lower School chapel service includes at least one musical performance each Friday.

The Houses of Ridley College  
There are currently 10 boarding houses at Ridley College, 5 boys' houses, 4 girls' houses, and 1 lower school house. Each house has a Head of House, Assistant Head of House, and Residence Don who help manage the house and act as guardians for the students in their care. Along with the staff, there are also student leaders in each of the houses. The two positions of leadership in the boarding houses are the House Captains and the Grade Representatives. House captains are all in their final year of High School. The 5 boys' houses are: Arthur Bishop West, Arthur Bishop East, Merritt North, Merritt South and Deans House. The 4 girls' houses are: Mandeville, Leonard, Gooderham East and Gooderham West. The lower school house is: Burgoyne

Arthur Bishop House 
The Arthur Bishop House is a boy's dormitory on campus and is located in the Merritt Quad along with Merritt House. The Arthur Bishop House contains two houses; Arthur Bishop West and Arthur Bishop East, also known as AB-West and AB-East. AB-West's mascot is the Bandit and the house colors are Maroon and Navy. The house charity for AB-West is the Congo Leadership Initiative. AB-East's mascot is the Beast and the house colors are Grey and Gold. The house charity for AB-East is Gillian's Place.

Gooderham House 
Gooderham house is a girls' dormitory on campus that contains two houses; G-East and G-West. It is located to the right of the Upper School. G-East has the mascot of the crocodile, has the house colour of green, and supports the charity Start-Me Up Niagara. G-West has the mascot of the flamingo, has the house colour of pink, and supports the charity of Red-Roof Retreat.

Academics

Ridley enrolls students from throughout Canada (including Ontario, Quebec, Alberta and the Maritimes), the United States, Latin America, Africa, Europe, the Caribbean, East Asia, South Asia and the Middle East. With A diverse community of over 63 countries represented in the Academic year 2018-2019
 
There are various facilities located within the Campus including Ridley's 'Second Century Building' and 'The Iggulden Gym'. Ridley College employs WiFi networks within all facilities for extensive daily usage. Class sizes vary between 8 and 20 students per class.

In 2004 the school adapted to the 4-year programme of the Ontario Academic Curriculum but it continues to offer a fifth, “PG” (“post-graduate”) year. Ridley is a test administration site for the SSAT, SAT, and ACT.

Ridley College is accredited to the Canadian Association of Independent Schools (CAIS) and the Canadian Educational Standards Institute (CESI)  under the Ridley College Board of Governors.

As a private, University-preparatory school, Ridley College is neither associated with nor accountable to any local school board.

Ridley College alumni pursue post-secondary degrees at top Canadian universities, including the University of Toronto, McGill University, Queen's University, the University of British Columbia, the University of Western Ontario, McMaster University, and the University of Waterloo. Recent U.S. and British university matriculants' destination schools include Harvard University, Spelman College, Yale University, Princeton University, Cornell University, Georgetown University, Oberlin College, Brown University, Oxford University, the London School of Economics, Cambridge University, Durham University, University of St Andrews, Imperial College, King's College London, University College London, and the University of Edinburgh.

School life

The School's Latin motto is Terar Dum Prosim, roughly translated as "May I Be Consumed In Service". The School uniform is known as ‘blues and greys’. The School Colours are orange and black, and the School mascot is the Tiger (known as ‘Hank’), which has been depicted in a large sculpture in front of School House.
Ridley's School Life philosophy could be said to embrace three essential qualities: academics, athletics, and citizenship.

One of Ridley's most notable traditions is the 'Snake Dance,' a school spirit-building celebration to inaugurate the fall sports season. Other traditions include: Mark Joslin Day, a day in honour of a former student where students purposely wear miss matched suits, an annual Cross-Country Run, intramural competition among dormitory residences for the Bradley Shield (girls') and Bermuda Cup (boys') trophies, the Chimes Challenge (a sprinting contest held during the midday chimes of the clock tower) and the annual Prize Day that concludes the school year, which is divided into three trimesters, known as the 'Michaelmas', 'Lent' and 'Trinity' terms. North American students typically return to their families during School holidays, and often international students who choose not to return to their home countries (or are unable due to time constraints) are billeted with Ridley families.

The School comprises a Lower School (Junior Kindergarten to grade 8, formerly the Middle School) and an Upper School (grades 9-12 and PG). Essential to School life is the Ridley boarding system (see House system), in which both boarders and day students participate, supervised by Housemasters who are also members of the School's faculty and reside within the residences. The residences are named for prominent alumni.

The School has dining halls for both the Lower and Upper Schools. After school, intramural and inter-School sports fixtures are held as well as various non-sport activities.

Often, alumni choose to have their weddings and baptisms take place in the Ridley College Chapel. The School faculty includes a full-time Chaplain, who also has academic duties.

Social discipline in the residential setting is based on the demerit system, and accumulations of demerits lead to the imposition of 'gatings', during which students are prohibited from leaving the campus and must 'check in' with the Staff on Duty each half-hour, on the half-hour, when not engaged in classroom work or taking meals.

Upon graduation from Ridley, graduates become entitled to use the post-nominal letters “O.R.” (“Old Ridleian”).

VEX Robotics

The Ridley College Robotics Team (1509 “Rmageddon”) was founded in 2009 by coaches Rodney Reimer and Scott McCambley. In its first year of existence, the team not only qualified but won the Excellence Award at the VEX Robotics World Championship. Since then, team 1509 has qualified and represented Ridley at the World Championship every single season; won a multitude of programming, driving, and engineering awards; and been present in the global leaderboards. Most recently, rmageddon advanced to the Semifinals at the 2015 VEX World Championship, placed 2nd in Canada (13th in the World) in the Programming Skills Challenge and came out as champion at the 2015 Ontario Provincial Championship, beating teams from all over the province.

The college's most successful team is proud to incubate and nourish successful computer scientists and engineers, who have gone to hold high Ridley's name at elite institutions such as the University of Western Ontario, Harvey Mudd, Georgia Institute of Technology, University of Toronto, University of Waterloo, and many more.

Athletics 

The school has several competitive athletic teams: ?

The Boys Basketball (First Team) is a very strong program at Ridley, winning numerous Canadian Independent Schools National Championships in the last few years (2015, 2016).

Similarly, the Ridley First Girls Basketball teams have won the Canadian Independent Schools National Championship in 2013, 2015, and 2016, along with CISAA titles in 2015, and 2016.

The varsity boys' rugby program went through a rebirth during the recent years, hosting the Canadian Independent School championships and medalling out of 15 teams, as well as ending up with a second-place finish in the CISAA rugby finals.

One of Ridley's most renowned athletics programs comprises its strong rowing traditions. Ridley has won the UK Royal Henley Regatta's prestigious Princess Elizabeth Challenge Cup four times, putting it in the same league as famous British schools such as Eton College and Pangbourne College, and the most of any Canadian boarding school, and it has trained numerous Canadian Olympic rowers. Ridley has previous Olympians as coaches, and competes in regattas internationally.

Other sports including the boys' soccer team, Canadian Independent Schools National Champions in 2003, and the boys' ice hockey team, which competes in the highly competitive Midwest Prep Hockey League. The school also has an Under 14, an Under 16, and a Varsity squash team.

Girls' sports include, but are not limited to, rugby, introduced in 2002; field hockey, volleyball, soccer, ice hockey, and tennis.

The Ridley College Tiger Swim Team has dominated in several categories in the All-Ontario (OFSSA) Championships. Their powerful Men's Team won the overall championship in 2006 over almost 300 other private and public Ontario schools. Their Women's Relay Team set successive back-to-back All-Ontario records in 2004 and 2005.  The 2008 swim team dominated in all areas, from regional to provincial, breaking decade-old records.

Sport participation is an expectation for Ridley students, and participation is mandatory. For those students that do not wish to be on a competitive team, Ridley has set in place a "Sports for Life" program providing recreational, non-competitive sports opportunities. The program includes sports such as sailing, fencing, curling, running, tennis, and badminton (though most of these teams have competitive counterparts).

A popular motto that students at the school go by in relation to sports, said by Ridley's Second Headmaster, Dr. Harry C. Griffith, is, “If you lose, say nothing. If you win, say less." Ridley's mascot, Hank, is depicted in a sculpture by artist Hugh Russel, an Old Ridleian.

Cadet Corps

The School maintains a well-established tradition of mandatory service in the Royal Canadian Army Cadets. Each year, all students, as cadets are required to parade in an inspection by a visiting Canadian or Commonwealth Inspecting Officer. Many Ridley Cadets down through the School's history have proceeded to distinguish themselves among Canada's Officer Corps. Ridley College is one of the two Cadet Corps in Canada that still continue to issue officer ranks to students within the corps. The Ridley College Cadet Corps No. 162 remains the largest cadet corps in Canada.

Notable alumni

 Frederick Walker Baldwin, Aviation Engineer, first Canadian (and third North American after the Wright Brothers) to pilot an aircraft
 Lord Montagu of Beaulieu, Conservative peer and LGBT pioneer
 Richard M. Ivey CC, Canadian lawyer and philanthropist, namesake of Ivey Business School and Companion of the Order of Canada.
 Henry Allen John, 8th Earl Bathurst
 , Nuclear Millwright overseeing the refurbishment phase of Canada's Darlington Candu Nuclear Reactor. He also sells real estate.

 Sir John Irving Bell, Regius Professor of Medicine, Oxford University, Rhodes Scholar, Founder of the Wellcome Trust Centre for Human Genetics
 Simon Bruce-Lockhart, headmaster of Norfolk Glenlyon School and other schools
 James Coyne, Rhodes Scholar, second Governor of the Bank of Canada
 Hume Cronyn OC, descendant of the Labatt brewery family, film, television and stage actor, AMPAS ("Oscar") nominee for The Seventh Cross, Tony Award winner as Polonius opposite Richard Burton's Hamlet, appeared in Cleopatra, 12 Angry Men, The Pelican Brief. Invested Officer of the Order of Canada, 1988.
 Robert George Brian Dickson, PC, CC, CD, LL.B, LL.D, Chief Justice of Canada, Companion of the Order of Canada
 David A. Dodge, Governor of the Bank of Canada.
 Colm Feore, film and stage actor, Trudeau; Pearl Harbor; The Sum of All Fears; The Insider
 James K. Gray OC, Co-Founder, Canadian Hunter Exploration, sold to Burlington Resources for $3.4 billion, Director of Brascan Corp., Canadian National Railways, Order of Canada
 Peter Gzowski CC, journalist and author, Morningside; The Private Voice, A Journal of Reflections.
 Josie Ho, Hong Kong actress, daughter of Macau billionaire, Stanley Ho
 David L. Humphreys, biographer of Canadian former Prime Minister Joe Clark
 Raine Maida, lead singer of Our Lady Peace (he did not graduate from Ridley)
 Duncan Coutts, bassist of Our Lady Peace
 Darcy McKeough OC, Former CEO of Union Gas and Former Treasurer of the Province of Ontario, appointed Officer of the Order of Canada
 Colonel Thomas Fraser Ritchie DSO, soldier in the Boer War and First World War
 Michael Sabia, President and CEO, Caisse de dépôt, Quebec
 C. Ross "Sandy" Somerville named "Golfer of the half century" by the Canadian Press, 1950
 Richard B. Wright OC, former faculty member, author of 11 novels, Giller Prize, Trillium Book Prize, recipient of the Governor General's Award, appointed Officer of the Order of Canada
 Humphrey Hume Wrong, Canadian diplomat, served as Canada's Ambassador to United States, succeeding Lester B. Pearson. Notable for his early involvement in negotiating the North Atlantic Treaty Organization (NATO). Named as undersecretary to NATO, but died before taking up the post.

List of headmasters
 John O. Miller (1889-1921)
 Harry C. Griffith (1921-1949)
 J. R. Hamilton (1949-1962)
 Ted Pilgrim (1962-1971)
 Richard Bradley (1971-1981)
 Jeremy Packard (1981-1989)
 Douglas Campbell (1989-1995)
 Rupert Lane (1995-2004)
 Jonathan Leigh (2004-2012)
 Edward Kidd (2012–present)

Other notable staff
Clement Melville Keys, a schoolmaster from 1899 to 1901
Simon Bruce-Lockhart, housemaster, later head of other schools 
 Edmund Burn, cricket coach, 1951 to 1969
 Dennis Hull, hockey coach

References

External links

 Ridley College
 Ridley College Alumni
 Ridley College at TopPrivateSchools.ca
 Ridley College at Peterson's
 Ridley College at Conference of Independent Schools of Ontario Athletic Association
 Ridley College at Canadian Association of Independent Schools
 Image of Ontario Heritage Trust Plaque for Ridley College
 Ridley College Bird's Eye View

Preparatory schools in Ontario
Boarding schools in Ontario
Private schools in Ontario
Educational institutions established in 1889
Buildings and structures in St. Catharines
Elementary schools in the Regional Municipality of Niagara
High schools in the Regional Municipality of Niagara
Education in St. Catharines
Anglican schools in Canada
Member schools of the Headmasters' and Headmistresses' Conference
1889 establishments in Ontario